Major Walter Reed (1851–1902) was a U.S. Army physician celebrated for work establishing that yellow fever is spread by mosquitoes.

Walter Reed may also refer to:

People
 Walter Reed (actor) (1916–2001), American actor
 Walter Reed (cricketer) (1839–1880), English cricketer
 Walter Reed (Canadian politician) (1869–1945)
 Walter D. Reed (1924–2022), United States Air Force general
 Walter L. Reed (1877–1956), U.S. Army general and son of Major Walter Reed
 Killah Priest (Walter Reed, born 1970), rapper
 Walt Reed (1917–2005), art historian and author

Military medical institutions
 Walter Reed General Hospital (WRGH), (1909–1951), Washington, DC, USA, a former U.S. Army general hospital
 Walter Reed Army Medical Center (WRAMC), (1951–2011), Washington, DC, once the U.S. Army's main hospital on the East Coast
 Walter Reed Army Medical Center neglect scandal, the 2007 scandal concerning substandard care of soldiers at WRAMC
Walter Reed Health Care System (WRHCS), a complex of U.S. Army hospitals and clinics in the Washington, DC, region
 Walter Reed Army Institute of Research (WRAIR), Silver Spring (Forest Glen), a research center and former tenant unit of the WRAMC installation
 Walter Reed National Military Medical Center (WRNMMC), a merged facility of WRAMC with the National Naval Medical Center which opened in Bethesda, MD

Other
 Walter Reed Medal, a military decoration given to those who participated in the yellow fever investigation
 Walter Reed Middle School, a school in Studio City, California
 "Walter Reed", a song by Michael Penn on the album Mr. Hollywood Jr., 1947

See also
 Walter Read (disambiguation)
 Walter Reade (disambiguation)
 Walter Reid (disambiguation)

Reed, Walter